Leopoldo Serantes (March 15, 1962 – September 1, 2021) was a Filipino amateur boxer and soldier. He competed at the 1988 Summer Olympics in Seoul, South Korea in the Light Flyweight (-48 kg) division, winning the bronze medal in a lost bout against Ivailo Marinov from Bulgaria in the semifinals. Serantes' win marked the first time in 24 years that an athlete from the Philippines won an Olympic medal since boxer Anthony Villanueva, his head coach, won a silver medal at the 1964 Summer Olympics, and he became the sixth Filipino overall to be awarded an Olympic medal.

Career
Serantes was a Philippine Army sergeant when he competed at the 1988 Olympics.

Southeast Asian Games
Bicol native Leopoldo Serantes was a member of the Philippine national boxing team during the 1980s. He is noted for having been the only gold medalist for the Philippines in the 1985 Southeast Asian Games in Bangkok, defeating Thai boxer Supad Boonrowd in the men's 48kg final. Serantes also successfully defended his title in the 1987 Southeast Asian Games in Indonesia, and he was one of two Filipinos who won a gold medal in boxing in that edition of the games.

1988 Olympic results
Below is Serantes' boying competition record in the light flyweight division at the 1988 Seoul Olympics:
Round of 64: Bye
Round of 32: Defeated Hassan Mustafa (Egypt) referee stopped contest in the second round
Round of 16: Defeated Sammy Stewart (Liberia) by decision, 5-0
Quarterfinals: Defeated Mahjoub Mjirich (Morocco) referee stopped contest in third round
Semifinal: Lost to Ivailo Khristov (Bulgaria) by decision, 0-5 (was awarded bronze medal)
Serantes was assured of an $18,500 bonus from a group of Filipino businessmen following his bronze win.

Later life
Serantes suffered from a long history of pulmonary illness later in life. In January 2021, he was reportedly placed under intensive care at the Philippine Veterans Hospital due to a serious pulmonary and heart condition.

Serantes died on September 1, 2021 at the age of 59 due to complications of chronic obstructive pulmonary disease.

References

1962 births
2021 deaths
Deaths from chronic obstructive pulmonary disease
Respiratory disease deaths in the Philippines
Asian Games competitors for the Philippines
Boxers at the 1982 Asian Games
Boxers at the 1988 Summer Olympics
Competitors at the 1985 Southeast Asian Games
Filipino male boxers
Philippine Army personnel
Light-flyweight boxers
Medalists at the 1988 Summer Olympics
Olympic boxers of the Philippines
Olympic bronze medalists for the Philippines
Olympic medalists in boxing
Southeast Asian Games gold medalists for the Philippines
Southeast Asian Games medalists in boxing
Philippine Sports Hall of Fame inductees